Wild-Eyed Dream is the debut studio album by American country music artist Ricky Van Shelton. The first singles released from the album from 1986 to 1988 were "Wild-Eyed Dream" and "Crime of Passion", which charted at #24 and #7, respectively. The last three singles, "Somebody Lied", "Life Turned Her That Way", and "Don't We All Have The Right" all reached #1. The album was certified platinum by the RIAA on July 24, 1989.

"Working Man's Blues" is a cover of the Merle Haggard song, while "Crazy Over You" was also released by the duo Foster & Lloyd as their debut single. "Life Turned Her That Way" was previously a #11 single in 1967 for Mel Tillis, and "I Don't Care" a #1 single for Buck Owens in 1964. Conway Twitty also recorded "Somebody Lied" for his 1985 album Don't Call Him a Cowboy. "Don't We All Have the Right" was originally recorded by Roger Miller on his 1970 album Trip in the Country.

Track listing

Personnel

 Eddie Bayers – drums
 Richard Bennett – electric guitar
 Steve Buckingham – acoustic guitar
 Dennis Burnside – piano
 Larry Byrom – acoustic guitar
 Paul Franklin – steel guitar
 Sonny Garrish – steel guitar
 Steve Gibson – electric guitar
 Hoot Hester – fiddle, mandolin
 David Hungate – bass guitar
 Roy Huskey, Jr. – upright bass
 Randy McCormick – piano
 Tony Migliore – piano
 Don Potter – acoustic guitar
 Tom Robb – bass guitar
 Michael Rhodes – bass guitar
 John Wesley Ryles – backing vocals
 Harry Stinson – percussion
 Ricky Van Shelton – acoustic guitar, lead vocals
 Tommy Wells – drums
 Bergen White – backing vocals
 Dennis Wilson – backing vocals

Charts

Weekly charts

Year-end charts

Certifications

References

1987 debut albums
Columbia Records albums
Ricky Van Shelton albums
Albums produced by Steve Buckingham (record producer)